Joseph "Joé" Treinen (February 1, 1911 – October 16, 1982) was a Luxembourgian canoeist who competed in the 1936 Summer Olympics. He was born in Luxembourg City.

In 1936 he finished sixth in the C-1 1000 metre competition and twelfth in the folding K-1 10000 metre event.

References
Joé Treinen's profile at Sports Reference.com

1911 births
1982 deaths
Sportspeople from Luxembourg City
Canoeists at the 1936 Summer Olympics
Luxembourgian male canoeists
Olympic canoeists of Luxembourg